Maxim Dmitrievich Kazakov (born March 27, 1993) is a Russian professional ice hockey player. He is currently an unrestricted free agent who most recently played under contract with HC Sibir Novosibirsk of the Kontinental Hockey League (KHL).

Kazakov made his Kontinental Hockey League debut playing with Avangard Omsk during the 2013–14 KHL season.

References

External links

1993 births
Living people
Admiral Vladivostok players
Avangard Omsk players
Metallurg Novokuznetsk players
Rouyn-Noranda Huskies players
Russian ice hockey left wingers
HC Sibir Novosibirsk players
Sportspeople from Omsk